Djoko may refer to:

 An alternative spelling of Joko or Jaka, a Javanese male name
 An alternative spelling of Đoko (a diminutive of the name Đorđe (Anglicanized as "George")), a Serbian male given name

See also 
 Đoković, a Serbian surname derived from the male given name "Đoka" or "Đoko"

Serbian masculine given names
Javanese names